Asia Nalani Vernimo (born February 11, 1990), better known by her stage name Asia Cruise, is an American R&B singer. In 2008, she became the first artist of Asian descent to be signed to Hitz Committee/Jive Records

Biography
Originally from Jacksonville, Florida, Asia Cruise is of Filipino descent. Signed to Jive Records in 2007, Cruise released her debut single "Selfish" in 2008 by revealing her face only after the music video was released. "Selfish" became a modest hit in the United States; peaking at number 33 on the Rhythmic Songs airplay, it spent nine weeks on the chart. Cruise also appeared in the music video for apl.de.ap's charity single "We Be Workin'".

Cruise has not been active musically since 2008.

Discography

Albums

Singles

References

1990 births
Living people
American contemporary R&B singers
21st-century American singers
American musicians of Filipino descent
Jive Records artists
Musicians from Jacksonville, Florida
21st-century American women singers